Phlomis chrysophylla, the golden-leaved Jerusalem sage, is a species of flowering plant in the family Lamiaceae , native to southwest Asia.

The specific epithet chrysophylla means "golden-leaved".

In cultivation it requires some protection in winter. It has gained the Royal Horticultural Society's Award of Garden Merit.

References

chrysophylla
Shrubs
Flora of Israel
Flora of Jordan
Flora of Lebanon
Flora of Syria
Taxa named by Pierre Edmond Boissier